is a former Japanese football player.

Club statistics

References

External links

Guardian's Stats Centre

1984 births
Living people
Hannan University alumni
Association football people from Hiroshima Prefecture
Japanese footballers
J1 League players
J2 League players
Ventforet Kofu players
Matsumoto Yamaga FC players
Association football defenders